José Álvarez de las Asturias Bohórquez y Goyeneche, 10th Marquess of Trujillos (23 March 1895 – 27 February 1993) was a Spanish horse rider. Álvarez de Bohórquez competed in the 1924 Summer Olympics and won the team jumping gold medal in the 1928 Summer Olympics. His name is also shortened to José Álvarez de Bohórquez, José Á. de Bohórquez, or José Álvarez.

Biography

José Álvarez de Bohórquez was born on 23 March 1895, in Madrid, Spain.Karlsson 1998, cited.

In the 1924 Summer Olympics in Paris, he finished ninth in the individual jumping and placed eighth as part of the Spanish team in the team jumping with his horse Acabado.

In the 1928 Summer Olympics in Amsterdam he finished tenth in the individual jumping and won the gold medal as part of the Spanish team in the team jumping with his horse Zalamero.

Álvarez de Bohórquez died on 27 February 1993.

References

 Sources consulted 

  (integral quote)
  (integral quote)
 

 Endnotes

External links
 
 
 

1895 births
1993 deaths
Sportspeople from Madrid
Spanish male equestrians
Spanish show jumping riders
Equestrians at the 1924 Summer Olympics
Equestrians at the 1928 Summer Olympics
Olympic equestrians of Spain
Olympic gold medalists for Spain
Olympic medalists in equestrian
Medalists at the 1928 Summer Olympics